The Japanese escort ship Amakusa was one of fourteen Etorofu-class Kaibōkan destroyer escorts built for the Imperial Japanese Navy during World War II.

Background and description
The Etorofu class was an improved version of the preceding  with a greater emphasis on anti-submarine warfare.

The main armament of the Etorofu class consisted of three Type 3  guns in single mounts, one superfiring pair aft and one mount forward of the superstructure. They were built with four Type 96  anti-aircraft guns in two twin-gun mounts, but the total was increased to 15 guns by August 1943. 36 depth charges were stowed aboard initially, but this later increased by August 1943 to 60 depth charges with a Type 97  trench mortar and six depth charge throwers. They received Type 22 and Type 13 radars and Type 93 sonar in 1943–44.

Construction and career
Amakusa was damaged by a magnetic mine at Chichi-jima on 20 December 1944. Sailed to Yokosuka and drydocked 13 January 1945. Repairs finished 22 January. On 26 February 1945 damaged by US Navy aircraft from Task Force 58 east of Izu Shima, 26 crewmen killed. Repaired at Yokosuka with repairs finished on 16 March 1945. On 9 August 1945, while lying in harbor at the Onagawa Bay, Miyagi Prefecture, Japan, the ship came under attack by a Corsair piloted by Royal Navy Lieutenant Robert Hampton Gray and was sunk; 71 crewmen, and Lt. Gray (while he earned the Victoria Cross), were killed.

In 2007, a memorial was dedicated to both the crew of Amakusa and Lt. Gray overlooking the town of Onagawa in Sakiyama Scenic Park.

Notes

References

External links

World War II naval ships of Japan
Ships sunk by British aircraft
Etorofu-class escort ships
1943 ships
Maritime incidents in August 1945
Shipwrecks of Japan
Ships built by Hitachi Zosen Corporation